Counter-jihad, also spelled counterjihad and known as the counter-jihad movement, is a self-titled political current loosely consisting of authors, bloggers, think tanks, street movements and campaign organisations all linked by apocalyptic beliefs that view Islam not as a religion but as a worldview that constitutes an existential threat to Western civilization. Consequently, counter-jihadists consider all Muslims as a potential threat, especially when they are already living within Western boundaries. Western Muslims accordingly are portrayed as a "fifth column", collectively seeking to destabilize Western nations' identity and values for the benefit of an international Islamic movement intent on the establishment of a caliphate in Western countries. The counter-jihad movement has been variously described as anti-Islamic, Islamophobic, inciting hatred against Muslims, and far-right. Influential figures in the movement include the far-right anti-Muslim conspiracy theorists Pamela Geller and Robert Spencer.

While the roots of the movement go back to the 1980s, it did not gain significant momentum until after the September 11 attacks in 2001, the 7 July 2005 London bombings and the Jyllands-Posten Muhammad cartoons controversy. As far back as 2006, online commentators such as Fjordman were identified as playing a key role in forwarding the nascent counter-jihad ideology. Bat Ye'or's Eurabia theory published in her eponymous book in 2005 also played an important factor in forming the movement. The movement received considerable attention in 2011 following the lone wolf attacks by right-wing extremist Anders Behring Breivik whose manifesto extensively reproduced the writings of prominent counter-jihad bloggers, and following the emergence of prominent street movements such as the English Defence League (EDL). The movement has adherents both in Europe and in North America. The European wing is more focused on the alleged cultural threat to European traditions stemming from immigrant Muslim populations, while the American wing emphasizes an alleged external threat, essentially terrorist in nature.

Several academic accounts have presented conspiracy theories as a key component of the counter-jihad movement. On a day-to-day level, it seeks to generate outrage at perceived Muslim crimes.

Overview
Counter-jihad is a radical right-wing movement that operates, according to Toby Archer, via the "sharing of ideas between Europeans and Americans and daily linking between blogs and websites on both sides of the Atlantic", and, according to Rasmus Fleischer, "calls for a counterjihad against the supposed Islamisation of Europe".
While the roots of the movement go back to the 1980s, it did not gain significant momentum until after the September 11 attacks in 2001.

The authors of Right-Wing Populism in Europe: Politics and Discourse describe the movement as heavily relying on two key tactics:

Benjamin Lee describes the "counter-jihad scene" as one where 

Two central counter-jihad themes have been identified: 
 the notion that Islam poses a threat to "Western civilisation", with a particular focus on "Muslims living in Europe", that is, within the European Counterjihad Movement (ECJM), "seen predominantly in terms of immigration", particularly Muslim immigration. 
 a lack of trust in regional, political and economic "elites", with a particular focus against the European Union (EU).

Counter-jihad movement

One of the first organizations of the counter-jihad movement (CJM), the 910 Group (later renamed to the International Civil Liberties Alliance) was founded in 2006 and announced on Gates of Vienna, "a principal blog of the CJM since 2004". Its stated purpose was to defend "liberties, human rights, and religious and political freedoms [that] are under assault from extremist groups who believe in Islamist supremacy". In April 2007, the counter-jihad current became visible as a movement operating in northwestern Europe with "The UK and Scandinavia Counterjihad Summit", organised by a transatlantic network of anti-Islam bloggers in Copenhagen, Denmark. The conference was hosted by American blogger Edward May, Danish activist Anders Gravers Pedersen, and Danish blogger Exile, and included participants such as Norwegian blogger Fjordman.

In October 2007 a second summit, "Counterjihad Brussels 2007", was hosted by the Belgian Flemish-nationalist party Vlaams Belang in the European Parliament building in Brussels, Belgium. This conference has been regarded as a crucial event in the movement's history and featured speakers Bat Ye'or and David Littman followed by "country reports" from delegates Paul Beliën and Filip Dewinter (Vlaams Belang, Belgium), Stefan Herre (PI blog, Germany), Nidra Poller (Pajamas Media blog, France), Gerard Batten (UK Independence Party, UK), Ted Ekeroth (Swedish Democrats, Sweden), Lars Hedegaard (International Free Press Society, Denmark), Jens Tomas Anfindsen (HonestThinking blog, Human Rights Service, Norway), Kenneth Sikorski (Tundra Tabloids blog, Finland), Johannes Jansen (Netherlands), Adriana Bolchini Gaigher (Lisistrata blog, Italy), Traian Ungureanu (Romania), Elisabeth Sabaditsch-Wolff (Austria), Matyas Zmo (Czech Republic), with further speeches by Arieh Eldad (Moledet, Israel).  Patrick Sookhdeo (Institute for the Study of Islam and Christianity, Barnabas Fund, UK), Dr Marc Cogen (Professor of International Law, Vesalius College, Belgium), Sam Solomon (Islamic Affairs Consultant, Christian Concern), Robert B. Spencer (Jihad Watch, David Horowitz Freedom Center), Andrew G. Bostom, and Laurent Artur du Plessis.

From 2009, the English Defence League (EDL) street movement began holding rallies with thousands of protesters. A March 2012 counter-jihad conference in Denmark drew 200–300 supporters from throughout Europe. Ten times the number of left-wing protesters staged a counter-demonstration. The 2012 conference in Denmark was claimed by its organisers, the EDL, to mark the starting point of a pan-European movement. There have been no official CJM conferences since 2013, pointing to a decline in the original movement. However, a high-point in the European street movement came in January 2015 when 25,000 people attended a Pegida rally in the German city of Dresden. In June 2018, 10,000 protesters attended a "Free Tommy" rally in London. It has been argued by Christopher Othen in his book Soldiers of a Different God: How the Counter-Jihad Movement Created Mayhem, Murder and the Trump Presidency that, after a fallout following the 2011 Norway attacks, the movement was reinvigorated by events such as the Arab Spring, a series of Islamist terrorist attacks, and the European migrant crisis, and to have influenced the success of Donald Trump in the 2016 United States presidential election. The counter-jihad movement has also been seen to have had numerous links with the Trump administration, and to have influenced Trump's ideology.

Organisation
Blogs such as Gates of Vienna, Jihad Watch, Atlas Shrugs, Politically Incorrect, The Brussels Journal are central to the transatlantic Counter-jihad movement (TCJM). Notable figures include: the editors of these blogs, respectively Edward 'Ned' May (pseudonym Baron Bodissey), Robert Spencer; Pamela Geller; Stefan Herre; and Paul Beliën. Notable writers in the Counter-jihad movement are Bat Ye'or, David Horowitz and Fjordman.

Think tanks such as the International Free Press Society and the David Horowitz Freedom Center have had an important role in providing funds and establishing international links. In time, a network of formal organisations has been established, with its main centres in Europe and the United States. A transatlantic umbrella organisation, Stop Islamization of Nations (SION) was established in 2012.
 
The International Free Press Society lists representatives from many parts of the counter-jihad spectrum on its board of advisors. Eurabia theorist Bat Ye'or is on the board of advisors, while owner of the blog Gates of Vienna, Edward S. May, serves as outreach co-ordinator on its board of directors.

American Counter-jihad movement

The U.S.-based Stop Islamization of America (SIOA) is led by Pamela Geller and Robert Spencer, as a program under their American Freedom Defense Initiative (AFDI). According to the AFDI website, the initiative aims, among other activities, to:
 Create state organizations that work towards the initiative's aims at a local level
 Organize grass-root small groups at the local level to fight what it labels "specific Islamic supremacist initiatives" in American cities
 Build strategic alliances with activist groups in Europe and Israel to engage in open and stealthy counter-jihad measures
 Promote candidates who "fight against the march of Islamic supremacists"
 Host conferences "that educate Americans about Leftist indoctrination and Islam’s quest for domination"

SIOA has been accused by the Anti-Defamation League of
promot[ing] a conspiratorial anti-Muslim agenda under the guise of fighting radical Islam. The group seeks to rouse public fears by consistently vilifying the Islamic faith and asserting the existence of an Islamic conspiracy to destroy "American" values.

In 2010, a group dubbed "Team B II", patterned after the 1970s anti-communist Team B, published a report titled "Shariah: The Threat to America" which has been cited as influencing the movement's discourse and the public's perception.

With the election of Donald Trump to the United States presidency in 2016, some have claimed that the American wing has achieved some influence in the US administration.

European Counter-Jihad Movement
The umbrella organization, Stop Islamisation of Europe, was founded by Anders Gravers Pedersen, who also sits on the board of the Stop Islamisation of Nations. There are numerous affiliated "Stop the Islamisation" and "Defense Leagues" in several European countries, among them Stop Islamisation of Denmark, Stop Islamisation of Norway, and the English Defence League.

Counter-jihad ideology
In the words of Toby Archer, a scholar of political extremism and terrorism, "Counter-jihad discourse mixes valid concerns about jihad-inspired terrorism with far more complex political issues about immigration to Europe from predominantly Muslim countries. It suggests that there is a threat not just from terrorism carried out by Islamic extremists but from Islam itself. Therefore, by extension, all European Muslims are a threat." Arun Kundnani, in a report published by the International Centre for Counter-terrorism, writes that the counter-jihad movement has evolved from earlier European far-right movements through a shift from race to values as identity markers: "In moving from neo‐Nazism to counter‐jihadism, the underlying structure of the narrative remains the same." Continuing on this note, he writes that comparing the counter-jihadist worldview to the older, neo-Nazi one, "Muslims have taken the place of blacks and multiculturalists are the new Jews."

According to prominent counter-jihadist Edward S. May, writing under the pseudonym Baron Bodissey, the counter-jihadist movement is based on the belief that "Islam is above all a totalitarian political ideology, sugar-coated with the trappings of a primitive desert religion to help veil its true nature. The publicly stated goal of Islamic theology and political ideology is to impose the rule of Islam over the entire world, and make it part of Dar al-Islam, the 'House of Submission'." Cas Mudde argues that various conspiracy theories with roots in Bat Ye'or's Eurabia are important to the movement. The main theme of these theories is an allegation that European leaders allow a Muslim dominance of Europe, whether by intention or not, through multicultural policies and lax immigration laws. According to Hope not Hate, counter-jihad discourse has replaced the racist discourse of rightwing, populist and nationalist politics in America and Europe "with the language of cultural and identity wars".

Toby Archer detects a difference between the European and American wings of the movement. The American wing emphasizes an external threat, essentially terrorist in nature. The European wing sees a cultural threat to European traditions stemming from immigrant Muslim populations. While Archer notes that the perceived failure of multi-culturalism is shared across much of the political spectrum, he argues the counter-jihad movement is a particular conservative manifestation of this trend. He acknowledges the movement's conservative defense of human rights and the rule of law but he believes by rejecting progressive policy it rejects much of what Europe is today.

The views of the counter-jihad movement have been criticized as a source of support for the anti-Muslim views of individuals inspired to take violent direct action. Anders Behring Breivik, responsible for the 2011 Norway attacks, published a manifesto explaining his views which drew heavily on the work of counter-jihad bloggers such as Fjordman. Daniel Pipes argues that a "close reading of his manifesto suggests" that Breivik wanted to discredit and undermine the movement's dedication to democratic change to further Breivik's "dreamed-for revolution" as the only alternative. Breivik has later identified himself as a fascist and voiced support for neo-Nazis, stating that he had exploited counter-jihad rhetoric in order to protect "ethno-nationalists", and instead start a media drive against what he deemed "anti-nationalist counterjihad"-supporters.

Executive director of the Institute of Race Relations, Liz Fekete, has argued that although most of the counter-jihad movement "stops short of advocating violence to achieve their goals", the most extreme parts share much of Breivik's discursive frameworks and vocabulary. She counterposits this with more mainstream counter-jihadists, that warn of Islamisation as a result of naïvety or indecisiveness, whom she identifies as a source of legitimacy for the former.

Theologist and philosopher Marius Timmann Mjaaland has described the role given to Christianity in some parts of the counter-jihad movement and has identified some aspects of the movement's ideology that he says links it to fascism-like conspiracy theories: 
The establishment of an allegedly continuous and coherent connection between the present-day conflict between the Christian West and Muslims, whereas analyses based on established historical science will dismiss any such claim as unfounded.
A claim that mainstream politicians and media in Western countries have in effect become internal enemies or "traitors", by respectively allowing the creation of multicultural societies and advocating "Marxism" and "political correctness".
This, in turn, has allowed Muslims to settle in Western lands, and thereby allegedly opened them to attack from within.
And, lastly, a Nietzschean, post-Christian worldview where the distinction between good and evil is given little attention, to the point where Christianity's ideal of "loving one's neighbour" is entirely omitted. Christianity is reduced from a system of belief to an identity marker, and a political mythology is built, that draws heavily on the Crusades.

Counter-jihad has sought to portray Western Muslims as a "fifth column", collectively seeking to destabilize Western nations' identity and values for the benefit of an international Islamic movement intent on the establishment of a caliphate in Western countries. Much of the Eurabia literature and Counter Jihad forums describe taqiyya as a manipulative strategy used by moderate Muslims to infiltrate and eventually overthrow society.

Supporters are often pro-Israel.

Comparison with anti-communism
The movement has been compared to the anti-communism of the Cold War. The Southern Poverty Law Center compares both as similar exaggerated threats. "Like the communists that an earlier generation believed to be hiding behind every rock, infiltrated 'Islamist' operatives today are said to be diabolically preparing for a forcible takeover."

See also

Alt-lite
Counter-terrorism
Far-right politics
Great Replacement
Islam and violence
Islamic fundamentalism
Islamofascism
Jihad
Jihadism
Persecution of Christians in Muslim countries
War against Islam

References
Notes

Bibliography

 
Conspiracy theories involving Muslims
Far-right politics in Europe
Far-right politics in North America
Anti-immigration politics